Ketakadas Kshemananda or Kshemananda Das was a 17th or 18th-century Bengali poet who wrote Manasar Bhasan, a version of Manasa Mangal Kavya. 

Manasar Bhasan was part of a Bengali poetic and performance tradition, Mangal Kavya, that was popular in the 13th to 18th centuries, involving sung poetry and religious worship. It tells the story of the snake goddess Manasa, but notably also depicts everyday village life. The text was used as the basis for Chand Manasar Kissa, a play produced by the Sansriti theater company in 2018 and 2019.

When Manasar Bhasan was published in the 1880s, the title page created the impression that the work was created by two people, "Ketakadas" and "Kshemananda." This was later discovered to be incorrect.

References

Nationality missing
Year of birth missing
17th-century Bengali poets
Bengali-language writers
People from Hooghly district
Poets from West Bengal